Rhea is the second-largest moon of Saturn and the ninth-largest moon in the Solar System, with a surface area that is compareable to the area of Australia. It is the smallest body in the Solar System for which precise measurements have confirmed a shape consistent with hydrostatic equilibrium.  It was discovered in 1672 by Giovanni Domenico Cassini.

Discovery 

Rhea was discovered by Giovanni Domenico Cassini on 23 December 1672.  It was the second moon of Saturn that Cassini discovered, and the third moon discovered around Saturn overall.

Name
Rhea is named after the Titan Rhea of Greek mythology, the "mother of the gods" and wife of Kronos, the Greek counterpart of the god Saturn. It is also designated Saturn V (being the fifth major moon going outward from the planet, after Mimas, Enceladus, Tethys, and Dione).

Cassini named the four moons he discovered (Tethys, Dione, Rhea, and Iapetus) Sidera Lodoicea (the stars of Louis) to honor King Louis XIV.  Astronomers fell into the habit of referring to them and Titan as Saturn I through Saturn V.  Once Mimas and Enceladus were discovered, in 1789, the numbering scheme was extended to Saturn VII, and then to Saturn VIII with the discovery of Hyperion in 1848.

Rhea was not named until 1847, when John Herschel (son of William Herschel, discoverer of the planet Uranus, and two other moons of Saturn, Mimas and Enceladus) suggested in Results of Astronomical Observations made at the Cape of Good Hope that the names of the Titans, sisters and brothers of Kronos (Saturn, in Roman mythology), be used.

Physical characteristics

Size, mass, and internal structure 

Rhea is an icy body with a density of about 1.236 g/cm3. This low density indicates that it is made of ~25% rock (density ~3.25 g/cm3) and ~75% water ice (density ~0.93 g/cm3). Although Rhea is the ninth-largest moon, it is only the tenth-most massive moon. Indeed, Oberon, the second-largest moon of Uranus, has almost the same size, but is significantly denser than Rhea (1.63 vs 1.24) and thus more massive, although Rhea is slightly larger by volume.

Before the Cassini-Huygens mission, it was assumed that Rhea had a rocky core.  However, measurements taken during a close flyby by the Cassini orbiter in 2005 cast this into doubt. In a paper published in 2007 it was claimed that the axial dimensionless moment of inertia coefficient was 0.4.  Such a value indicated that Rhea had an almost homogeneous interior (with some compression of ice in the center) while the existence of a rocky core would imply a moment of inertia of about 0.34.  In the same year another paper claimed the moment of inertia was about 0.37. Rhea being either partially or fully differentiated would be consistent with the observations of the Cassini probe. A year later yet another paper claimed that the moon may not be in hydrostatic equilibrium meaning that the moment of inertia cannot be determined from the gravity data alone.  In 2008 an author of the first paper tried to reconcile these three disparate results. He concluded that there is a systematic error in the Cassini radio Doppler data used in the analysis, but after restricting the analysis to a subset of data obtained closest to the moon, he arrived at his old result that Rhea was in hydrostatic equilibrium and had a moment of inertia of about 0.4, again implying a homogeneous interior.

The triaxial shape of Rhea is consistent with a homogeneous body in hydrostatic equilibrium rotating at Rhea's angular velocity. Modelling in 2006 suggested that Rhea could be barely capable of sustaining an internal liquid-water ocean through heating by radioactive decay; such an ocean would have to be at about 176 K, the eutectic temperature for the water–ammonia system. More recent indications are that Rhea has a homogeneous interior and hence that this ocean does not exist.

Surface features 

Rhea's features resemble those of Dione, with dissimilar leading and trailing hemispheres, suggesting similar composition and histories. The temperature on Rhea is 99 K (−174 °C) in direct sunlight and between 73 K (−200 °C) and 53 K (−220 °C) in the shade.

Rhea has a rather typical heavily cratered surface, with the exceptions of a few large Dione-type chasmata or fractures (wispy terrain) on the trailing hemisphere (the side facing away from the direction of motion along Rhea's orbit) and a very faint "line" of material at Rhea's equator that may have been deposited by material deorbiting from its rings.  Rhea has two very large impact basins on its anti-Cronian hemisphere (facing away from Saturn), which are about 400 and 500 km across.  The more northerly and less degraded of the two, called Tirawa, is roughly comparable to the basin Odysseus on Tethys.  There is a 48 km-diameter impact crater at 112°W that is prominent because of an extended system of bright rays.  This crater, called Inktomi, is nicknamed "The Splat", and may be one of the youngest craters on the inner moons of Saturn. No evidence of any endogenic activity has been discovered.

Its surface can be divided into two geologically different areas based on crater density; the first area contains craters which are larger than 40 km in diameter, whereas the second area, in parts of the polar and equatorial regions, has only craters under that size. This suggests that a major resurfacing event occurred some time during its formation. The leading hemisphere is heavily cratered and uniformly bright. As on Callisto, the craters lack the high relief features seen on the Moon and Mercury. It has been theorized that these cratered plains are up to four billion years old on average.  On the trailing hemisphere there is a network of bright swaths on a dark background and few visible craters. It had been thought that these bright areas might be material ejected from ice volcanoes early in Rhea's history when its interior was still liquid. However, observations of Dione, which has an even darker trailing hemisphere and similar but more prominent bright streaks, show that the streaks are actually ice cliffs resulting from extensive fracturing of the moon's surface. The extensive dark areas are thought to be deposited tholins, which are a mix of complex organic compounds generated on the ice by pyrolysis and radiolysis of simple compounds containing carbon, nitrogen and hydrogen.

The January 17, 2006 distant flyby by the Cassini spacecraft yielded images of the wispy hemisphere at better resolution and a lower Sun angle than previous observations. Images from this and subsequent flybys showed that Rhea's streaks in fact are tectonically formed ice cliffs (chasmata) similar to those of Dione.

Formation
The moons of Saturn are thought to have formed through co-accretion, a similar process to that believed to have formed the planets in the Solar System. As the young giant planets formed, they were surrounded by discs of material that gradually coalesced into moons. However, a proposed model for the formation of Titan may also shine a new light on the origin of Rhea and Iapetus. In this model, Titan was formed in a series of giant impacts between pre-existing moons, and Rhea and Iapetus are thought to have formed from part of the debris of these collisions.

Atmosphere 
On November 27, 2010, NASA announced the discovery of a tenuous atmosphere—an exosphere. It consists of oxygen and carbon dioxide in proportion of roughly 5 to 2. The surface density of the exosphere is from 105 to 106 molecules in a cubic centimeter depending on local temperature. The main source of oxygen is radiolysis of water ice at the surface by ions supplied by the magnetosphere of Saturn. The source of the carbon dioxide is less clear, but it may be related to oxidation of the organics present in ice or to outgassing of the moon's interior.

Possible ring system 

On March 6, 2008, NASA announced that Rhea may have a tenuous ring system. This would mark the first discovery of rings around a moon.  The rings' existence was inferred by observed changes in the flow of electrons trapped by Saturn's magnetic field as Cassini passed by Rhea.  Dust and debris could extend out to Rhea's Hill sphere, but were thought to be denser nearer the moon, with three narrow rings of higher density. The case for a ring was strengthened by the subsequent finding of the presence of a set of small ultraviolet-bright spots distributed along Rhea's equator (interpreted as the impact points of deorbiting ring material).  However, when Cassini made targeted observations of the putative ring plane from several angles, no evidence of ring material was found, suggesting that another explanation for the earlier observations is needed.

Exploration 
The first images of Rhea were obtained by Voyager 1 & 2 spacecraft in 1980–1981.

There were five close targeted fly-bys by the Cassini orbiter: at a distance of 500 km on November 26, 2005, at a distance of 5,750 km on August 30, 2007, at a distance of 100 km on March 2, 2010, and at 69 km flyby on January 11, 2011 and a last flyby at 992 km on March 9, 2013.  Rhea has been also imaged many times from long to moderate distances by the orbiter.

Gallery

See also 
 Former classification of planets
 List of natural satellites
 Rhea in fiction
 Rings of Rhea
 Subsatellite
 Moons of Saturn

Notes

References

External links 

 Rhea Profile at NASA's Solar System Exploration site
 The Planetary Society: Rhea
 Cassini images of Rhea 
 Images of Rhea at JPL's Planetary Photojournal
 Movie of Rhea's rotation from the National Oceanic and Atmospheric Administration site
 Rhea global and polar basemaps (March 2012) from Cassini images
 Rhea altlas  (released December 2010) from Cassini images
 Rhea nomenclature and Rhea map with feature names from the USGS planetary nomenclature page
 Google Rhea 3D, interactive map of the moon
 Saturn's moon Rhea has thin atmosphere

 
16721223
Discoveries by Giovanni Domenico Cassini
Moons of Saturn
Moons with a prograde orbit